Yaldor Sub Sector was the scene of some of the major infiltration by Pakistani Northern Light Infantry battalions and some of the major battles of Kargil War were fought here. 

The sub-sector includes Yaldor, a hamlet of the Dah villlage in the Indus river basin in the Leh district of Ladakh in India. The village, in the upper reaches of the mountains near the Line of Control that divided the Indian-administered Jammu and Kashmir and Kashmir, abuts the Yaldor nullah. The area was a focal point during the Kargil War because of its strategic location between Kargil, Leh and Baltistan. Only a few shepherds live in Yaldor village, spending their summers here and their winters in Garkhun, taking their livestock with them. One of the shepherds from Garkhun, Tashi Namgyal, was looking for a missing yak and was the first to report infiltrators from Pakistan on 3 May 1999 to the Indian Army. The village has an army patrol base, which set up in 1997 even before the Kargil infiltration of 1999. As of 2019, the village is out of bounds for tourists.

Terrain and weather
The Yaldor nullah is an integral part of the area's terrain. It is made up of two streams: Yaldor West, or Gragrio, and Yaldor East, or Junk Lungpa. They merge at their namesake village before joining the Indus River at  Dah. Due to mountainous terrain the roads in the area of the village are serpentine. Known during the Kargil war for its difficult terrain, Yaldor was the focal point to launch attack on the 4,821-m Kukerthang and the 5,103-m Tharu despite many nullahs and non-tactical terrain. The terrain is so difficult that Indian Army and Pakistan Army, under mutual understanding left their posts in this area of LoC unattended during the harsh winter. Temperatures in winter range from minus 10–15 degrees Celsius during the day to minus 35–40 degree at night. Even in summer, overnight temperatures generally hover around minus 5–10 degrees.

Wildlife

Though the area is known for bitter cold weather, a lot of birds and mammals can be seen in and around Yaldor. These include Pallas Dippers, Blue whistling thrush, Brown Dipper and Greenish Leaf Warblers. Also can be seen are Common Swift, Eurasian Crag Martin, Large-billed Crow, and Mountain Chiffchaff. Among other bird species in the area include Grey Wagtail, Hume's leaf warbler, Red-mantled Rosefinch and Red-fronted Serin. 
Occasionally Himalayan Ibex can also be seen in the area.

Kargil war 1999
Yaldor Sub Sector was infiltrated by battalions of the Pakistani Northern Light Infantry, and some of the major battles of Kargil War were fought here including battles to retake Jubar, Point 4812, Point 5203, Munthodalo, and Khalubar. During the war a helipad was built in the area for safe transport of troops and material. 

Between 3–5 May 1999 two Indian army patrols in Yaldor area encountered a group of armed men,  from Pakistan-administered Kashmir. The Indian Army's first contact in the Banju area with infiltrators from Pakistan, who aimed to seize mountain peaks inside India to escalate Kashmir conflict. This encounter culminated in the Kargil War. The scene of some of the major battles of Kargil War, in May 1999 the 12 JKLI went through the Junk Lungpa (Lungpa means stream in Ladakhi) at night to drive a wedge between enemy's defenses on Point 5203 and Khalubar Ridge, and captured Point 5390. During Operation Vijay the 70 Infantry Brigade was responsible for recovery of maximum quantity of arms and ammunition and killing over 300 enemy personnel in this sector. It also captured 6 PoWs alive, providing much needed proof of Pakistani involvement. The Ladakh Buddhist Association (LBA) which played a key role in providing porters for the Indian Army during the conflict also sent LBA youth volunteers to Yaldor on June 23, 1999 to act as porters. 

Brigadier Devinder Singh, the commander of an infantry brigade, who was given the responsibility for conducting operations in Batalik-Yaldor sector during Operation Vijay, was conferred VSM for his actions. Captain BM Cariappa of 5 PARA, that took part in the battle to recapture Point 5203 was awarded Vir Chakra for his gallantry in several battles in sector. By July 8, 1999 almost the entire Yaldor sector was liberated. The Ladakh Scouts, one of the first units to be deployed in the region for Operation Vijay, were awarded Unit citation for bravery during the battles in the Batalik-Yaldor-Chorbatla sector, especially for capture of Point 5203. They were also awarded the Chief of Army Staff Banner for gallantry, which was received by Captain Naresh Bishnoi of 71 Armoured Regiment on deputation with Ladakh Scouts. The attack on Point 5203 was led by Capt Naresh Bishnoi, the company commander of L Company, Karokaram Wing Ladakh Scouts on the night of 21/22 June 1999. This company under this captain (nicknamed Nabi by the Pakistanis) thereafter in a series of relentless operations re-captured Dog Hill, Stangba, Pandma Go and then Point 5229 between 05 July and 10 July 1999 from the Pakistanis. The company captured Nk Inayat Ali of 5 NLI alive, and a huge cache of arms and ammunition left behind by the fleeing Pakistanis. Capt Naresh Bishnoi was awarded the Sena Medal for Gallantry for these operations  Major M. Sarvanan of 1 Bihar battalion lost his life on May 29, 1999 while trying to capture Point 4268, he was awarded VrC (posthumous) for his actions, his body was recovered by Indian troops only on July 7, 1999. Major Sonam Wangchuk of Ladakh Scouts was awarded the Mahavir Chakra for actions in same area on June 2, 1999.

Post Kargil war 1999
H. S. Panag after taking over as Brigade Commander in January 2000 oversaw a military operation in the Yaldor Sub Sector that destroyed 35 Pakistani bunkers and killed several Pakistani soldiers across the LoC, giving India complete control over Batalik sector. This also gave the Indian Army an option to threaten the Pakistani posts opposite Turtuk sector.
eastern side of Karubar Bowl.

See also
 Point 5310

References

External links 
 Yaldor nullah on OpenStreetMap

Ladakh
Kargil War